Krzysztof Penderecki's Cello Concerto No. 1, also known by its original Italian title Concerto per violoncello ed orchestra, Nr. 1, is a revised version of Penderecki's Concerto per violino grande e orchestra, which was never published nor recorded. It was transcribed for cello in 1973.

Composition and premiere 

The concerto, which was commissioned by Bronisław Eichenholz, was initially conceived for a violino grande, an instrument with five strings which combines the ranges of the violin and the viola. It was finished in 1967 and first performed in Östersund on July 1, 1967. Eichenholz played the violino grande on this occasion, and the Royal Stockholm Philharmonic Orchestra played under the baton of Henryk Czyż. However, this version of the concerto was only performed twice and never received much attention. After this performance, it was only performed again once in the Hopkins Center Congregation of the Arts, during the Fourth International Webern Festival, held at Dartmouth College in New Hampshire.

Five years afterwards, Penderecki decided to transcribe the concerto, replacing the violino grande with a cello. It was dedicated to Siegfried Palm, who also premiered it on September 7, 1972, in the Edinburgh Festival. This transcribed version of the concerto was published by the Polish Music Publishing House and the Moeck Musikinstrumente + Verlag.

Analysis 

The original version of the Concerto consisted of two movements, namely, Quasi purgatorio and Suoni celeste. However, the final version is in one movement only. It takes 15 to 20 minutes to perform. It features a lento introduction with an initial cadenza, which was composed ex professo for some of its performances.

Reception 

Despite the fact that the first version was only performed twice, it garnered positive reviews from critics. Shirley Fleming, from High Fidelity, called it a fascinating piece.

Notable recordings 

Following are some of the most well-known recordings of this piece:

References 

Compositions by Krzysztof Penderecki
1972 compositions
Contemporary classical compositions